Konar Pir (also Romanized as Konār Pīr, Kenar Pir, and Kunār Pīr) is a village in Miyan Ab-e Shomali Rural District, in the Central District of Shushtar County, Khuzestan Province, Iran. At the 2006 census, its population was 1,096, in 239 families.

References 

Populated places in Shushtar County